Antonina Dubinina (born 23 October 1996) is a Serbian figure skater who competes in ladies' singles. She is the 2019 Skate Helena champion, a five-time Serbian national champion, and competed in the final segment of the 2019 European Championships.

Personal life 
Dubinina was born on 23 October 1996 in Moscow, Russia. , she is a university student.

Career

Early years 
Dubinina began learning to skate in 2001 as a five-year-old. As a child, she was taught by Galina Savchenkova at the Central Youth Theater in Mytishchi, a suburb of Moscow. She represented Russia in the senior ranks at three international competitions in February and March 2014.

Career for Serbia 
Dubinina made her senior international debut for Serbia at the CS Lombardia Trophy in September 2016. Coached by Svetlana Sokolovskaia at CSKA Moscow, she placed 29th in the short program at the 2017 European Championships in Ostrava, Czech Republic. She also missed qualifying for the free skate at the 2018 European Championships in Moscow, Russia, and at the 2018 World Championships in Milan, Italy.

Coached by Sokolovskaia and Stanislav Zakharov, Dubinina advanced to the final segment at the 2019 European Championships in Minsk, Belarus.

Programs

Competitive highlights 
CS: Challenger Series

For Serbia

For Russia

References

External links 
 

1996 births
Living people
Serbian female single skaters
Figure skaters from Moscow